Kiili (before 1977: Veneküla) is a borough in Harju County, northern Estonia. It is the administrative center of Kiili Parish. Kiili has a population of 1,492 (as of 2015).

References

External links
Kiili Parish 

Boroughs and small boroughs in Estonia